Shiv Chhatrapati Award (also known as Shiv Chhatrapati State Sports Award) is the highest prestigious sports award honoured annually to the players of Maharashtra by the Government of Maharashtra in India .

The Government of Maharashtra instituted in 1969–70 a scheme for giving the Shiv Chhatrapati State Awards to sportsmen and women. The State Government has approved 24 games for men and 12 for women for this purpose.

Prize and selection
At present, the award carries a cash prize of 3 lakh, a memento with a headgear of Shiv Chhatrapati, a sword, and Jari Patka placed in a tray supported by a wooden stand and citation along with lifetime right to travel by MSRTC bus free of cost. The winners are selected by a committee appointed by the Government of Maharashtra.

Award categories
Lifetime achievement award
Best organiser
Jijamata award for best coach
Best player award
Adventure sports award

Rowing
{|class="plainrowheaders" style="width:100%"
|-
|

Chess
{|class="plainrowheaders" style="width:100%"
|-
|

Judo
{|class="plainrowheaders" style="width:100%"
|-
|

Shooting
{|class="plainrowheaders" style="width:100%"
|-
|

Mountaineering
{|class="plainrowheaders" style="width:100%"
|-
|

Wrestling
{|class="plainrowheaders" style="width:100%"
|-
|

Weight Lifting
{|class="plainrowheaders" style="width:100%"
|-
|

Cricket
{|class="plainrowheaders" style="width:100%"
|-
|

Cycling
{|class="plainrowheaders" style="width:100%"
|-
|

Badminton
{|class="plainrowheaders" style="width:100%"
|-
|

Rope Mallakhamb
{|class="plainrowheaders" style="width:100%"
|-
|

References

Civil awards and decorations of Maharashtra